Razgah may refer to:
 Razgah, Ardabil (رزگاه - Razgāh)
 Razgah, East Azerbaijan (رزگاه - Razgāh)
 Razgah, West Azerbaijan (رازگاه - Rāzgāh)

See also
 Rezgah (disambiguation)